Franck Pascal Paul Tabanou (born 30 January 1989) is a French professional footballer who last played for Guingamp as a left-back. Tabanou is a French youth international having starred at under-20 and under-21 level. He played with the under-20 team at the 2009 Mediterranean Games.

Club career

Early career
Tabanou began his football career at AS Choisy-le-Roi, a club located in the southeastern suburbs of Paris. Growing up in the greater Paris area, he supported Paris Saint-Germain during his childhood. After four years at the club, in June 2002, he signed with professional club Le Havre. While in the club's youth academy, Tabanou was supervised by club coaches Thierry Uvenard and Luc Bruder. After three years at the club, he departed and returned to Paris joining the Centre de Formation de Paris, a youth sporting club designed to cater only to football players under the age of 19.

Toulouse
Upon his arrival to the club, Tabanou was inserted onto the club's under-18 team for the 2006–07 season and had a successful campaign. Midway through the season, he was called up to the club's Championnat de France amateur team in the fourth division. Tabanou appeared in five matches with the team. Ahead of the 2007–08 season, he was promoted to the reserve team on a permanent basis and featured in 20 matches.

In the ensuing season, Tabanou began training with the senior team under manager Alain Casanova. He appeared in several pre-season matches, but endured criticism for some of his performances as the pre-season wore on. Tabanou, himself, admitted that the criticism was justified stating that he relied too much on his technical skills. As a result, prior to the start of the season, he was demoted back to the reserve team. In January 2009, Tabanou was called back into the senior team by Casanova who was impressed by the player's performance with the reserve team. After appearing on the bench in several matches, he made his professional debut on 2 May 2009 in a league match against Marseille. Tabanou appeared as a substitute in the match, which ended 2–2. Two days later, he signed his first professional contract after agreeing to a one-year deal with the club. Tabanou, subsequently, appeared in the final four matches of the season. One of those matches including his first professional start against Saint-Étienne.

Tabanou was officially promoted to the senior team for the 2009–10 season and assigned the number 27 shirt. He featured as a substitute in the first two matches of the season and, by mid-September, had permanently taken over as starter on the left side of midfield. In January 2010, with the player's contract due to expire in June, Toulouse signed Tabanou to a three-year contract extension. On 16 January, Tabanou rewarded the club's decision to extend him by scoring a double in a 3–1 victory over Valenciennes. On 10 April, he repeated this feat by netting another two goals in a 4–0 home win over Grenoble.

Due to injuries to incumbent left back Cheikh M'Bengue, Casanova tasked Tabanou with the job of deputizing for him for the 2010–11 season. Tabanou started in the position for the majority of the fall campaign and assisted on his first two goals of his career in a 2–0 win over Nancy and a 3–1 loss to Rennes.

Saint-Étienne
On 28 July 2013, Tabanou trains with Ligue 1 club Saint-Étienne, on the verge of signing a new contract with them following a transfer from Toulouse. He scored his first goal against Esbjerg in the Europa League.

Swansea City
On 19 June 2015, Tabanou joined Swansea City for a reported £3.5 million. Tabanou then went on to make his debut in English football in the EFL Cup vs York City where he played his first full 90 minutes for the club.

Saint-Étienne (loan)
On 15 January 2016, Tabanou returned to Saint-Étienne on loan from Swansea for the rest of the season.

Granada (loan)
On 31 August 2016, Tabanou joined Spanish club Granada on a season-long loan deal.

Guingamp
On 1 August 2017, it was announced that Tabanou was released by Swansea City at the end of the 2016–17 season and joined French club Guingamp.

Career statistics

References

External links
 
 
 

1989 births
Living people
People from Thiais
Footballers from Val-de-Marne
Association football fullbacks
Association football midfielders
French footballers
Ligue 1 players
La Liga players
Toulouse FC players
AS Saint-Étienne players
Swansea City A.F.C. players
Granada CF footballers
En Avant Guingamp players
France youth international footballers
France under-21 international footballers
French expatriate footballers
Expatriate footballers in Wales
Expatriate footballers in Spain
French expatriate sportspeople in Wales
Competitors at the 2009 Mediterranean Games
Mediterranean Games competitors for France